American Jewish University (AJU), formerly the separate institutions University of Judaism and Brandeis-Bardin Institute, is a private Jewish university in Los Angeles, California.

AJU's academic division includes the College of Arts and Sciences, the Fingerhut School of Education, The David L. Lieber Graduate School, and the Ziegler School of Rabbinic Studies, a Conservative Jewish rabbinical seminary. AJU is host to the Miller Introduction to Judaism Program, which prepares students to convert to Judaism and engages interfaith couples and families, as well as three "think tanks": the Institute on American Jewish-Israel Relations,  and the Sigi Ziering Institute for Exploring the Ethical and Religious Implications of the Holocaust and the Center for Policy Options. At its Brandeis-Bardin Campus, the University oversees Camp Alonim, Gan Alonim Day Camp and the BCI Program. Its largest component is its Whizin Center for Continuing Education in which 12,000 students are enrolled annually in non-credit granting courses. Classes, lectures, author events, concerts and performances are offered daytime and evening for all ages of the community.

History 
The University of Judaism was founded in 1947. The spiritual founder was Dr. Mordecai Kaplan, a Jewish thinker and philosopher whose goal was to create an institution representing the diversity of Judaic expression in the United States. Another co-founder was Rabbi Jacob Pressman. Initially a project of the Jewish Theological Seminary in New York City and the Bureau of Jewish Education of Greater Los Angeles, the UJ became an independent institution in the 1970s. It became officially non-denominational with the ascension to the presidency of Dr. Robert Wexler (1992-2018) at the beginning of his tenure. Dr. Wexler was preceded in the presidency by Dr. Simon Greenberg (1947–1963) and Dr. David Lieber (1963–1992). The current president is Dr. Jeffrey Herbst (2018–present).

In March 2007, officials from both the University of Judaism and the Brandeis-Bardin Institute, an education and camping organization in Simi Valley, announced the two parties would merge into a new organization called the American Jewish University.

Campus resources and facilities 
The American Jewish University campus in Bel Air, California is home to the Ostrow Library, which contains over 120,000 volumes, electronic resources, and contains one of the West Coast's largest collections of Judaica. The campus also includes the Gindi Auditorium, a 475-seat theatre featuring concerts, celebrations, and other programs. The campus also includes dormitories and a recently completed student union with fitness facilities, a basketball court, and grass field.

American Jewish University's Brandeis-Bardin campus is located in Simi Valley, California and is home to Camp Alonim and the BCI Program, as well as "experiential learning" programs like the Jene Fellowship.  The campus is also a retreat and conference center.

Art galleries
The Marjorie and Herman Platt Gallery and Borstein Art Gallery play host to many major exhibitions, both of Jewish and non-Jewish art. Past artists at the Platt Gallery have included David Hockney, Jim Dine and Frank Stella as well as works by the Gallery's donor, Herman Platt. The Smalley Sculpture Garden on the campus grounds has a collection that includes the work of well-known contemporary sculptors.  Dedicated in 1981, the sculptures include works by Beverly Pepper, Sol LeWitt, George Rickey, Jenny Holzer, Anthony Caro and George Rickey.

Undergraduate study

The College of Arts and Sciences 

The College of Arts and Sciences was the program of undergraduate study at AJU. It was announced in October, 2018, that the university will close the undergraduate program. The academic program itself at the college granted the Bachelor of Arts degree.

Student life
The American Jewish University was home to an active undergraduate student life. Students were encouraged to participate in student organizations in order to enrich their undergraduate experience.  If a student determined that an organization they might be interested in was not yet established, students were welcome to establish new clubs and receive funding based upon student support and need.

Student organizations included: the ASAJU (Student Government), Bio-Ethics Association, Hillel, Honor Society, Israel Action, Model United Nations, Political Science Association, Peer Mentoring Program, Psychology Association, Sports Club, and Tikkun Olam (Social Action).

Graduate study

The Graduate School of Nonprofit Management 
The Graduate School of Nonprofit Management offers a customized Master of Business Administration degree in Nonprofit Management.

The Graduate Center for Jewish Education 
The Fingerhut School of Education offers both a full and part-time Master of Arts in Education (MAEd), a half-time Master of Arts in Teaching (MAT), a Master of Arts in Early Childhood Education (MAEd ECE) and a dual MAEd and MBA in Nonprofit Management degree.  In addition, the Graduate Center for Jewish Education offers various certificate and continuing education initiatives for experienced educators.

The Ziegler School of Rabbinic Studies 

In addition to Rabbinic ordination recognized by the Rabbinical Assembly of Conservative Judaism, the Ziegler School offers programs culminating in the awarding of a Master of Arts in Rabbinic Studies. This degree may be combined with the M.A.Ed. or M.B.A. programs. The Ziegler School also encompasses the Miller Introduction to Judaism Program, which supports those who are considering converting to Judaism, as well as Jews who wish to reconnect with their heritage.

Continuing Education 
AJU offers many programs of study through its Whizin Center for Continuing Education. These studies most often take the form of individual classes generally taken simply for personal enjoyment and edification. Classes are offered in language studies, Jewish studies, literature, fine arts, dance and fitness, performance arts, and other varied areas.  One of its largest programs is the annual Public Lecture Series held at Universal Studios' Gibson Amphitheater and is attended by five to six thousand series ticket holders.  Featured speakers have included President Bill Clinton, Secretaries of State Henry Kissinger, Madeleine Albright and Colin Powell, as well as Israeli Prime Ministers Ehud Barak and Shimon Peres.

Gallery

Notable faculty and staff 
Bradley Shavit Artson, Vice President and Dean of the Ziegler School of Rabbinic Studies
Maurice Ascalon, Faculty, School of Fine Arts, University of Judaism
Michael Berenbaum , Director, Sigi Ziering Institute and Professor
Aryeh Cohen, Professor of Rabbinic Literature
Zvi Dershowitz, Rabbi Emeritus of Sinai Temple, Los Angeles
Elliot Dorff, Rector and Distinguished Professor of Jewish Philosophy
David Lieber, President Emeritus
Rabbi Robert Wexler, President Emeritus and Lou and Irma Colen Distinguished Service Lecturer In Bible

See also 

 List of colleges and universities in California
 List of Jewish universities and colleges in the United States
 History of the Jews in Los Angeles

References

External links 

Official website

 
Jewish universities and colleges in the United States
Universities and colleges in Los Angeles
Conservative Judaism in California
Bel Air, Los Angeles
Jewish seminaries
Jews and Judaism in Los Angeles
Schools accredited by the Western Association of Schools and Colleges
Educational institutions established in 1947
1947 establishments in California
Private universities and colleges in California